The New Evergreen Commercial Historic District is a  historic district in Evergreen, Conecuh County, Alabama.  It is bounded by Mill, Cooper, Rural, Court, Liberty, East Front, Cary and Despious streets.  The district is primarily commercial, with examples of the Art Deco, neoclassical, Victorian, Romanesque Revival, and Colonial Revival styles. Some are plain brick commercial structures with no distinct style.  The district contains 39 properties, with 30 contributing and 9 noncontributing to the district.  It was added to the National Register of Historic Places on January 21, 1994.

References

National Register of Historic Places in Conecuh County, Alabama
Historic districts in Conecuh County, Alabama
Historic districts on the National Register of Historic Places in Alabama